Take Me to the Disco is the second studio album recorded by American singer-songwriter Meg Myers. The album was released on July 20, 2018 by 300 Entertainment.

Background
The album includes the lead single "Numb", which was released on April 27, 2018. On June 1, the title track was released as the second single. The third single from the album, "Jealous Sea", was released on June 28. The fourth single "Tourniquet" was released July 13, a week prior to the album's release.

Myers worked with producer Christian "Leggy" Langdon on the album, recording it mostly at his studio in Topanga. All her previous works were produced by Doctor Rosen Rosen. After completing work on the album, Myers and Atlantic Records mutually parted ways. She brought the completed album to New York based indie label 300 Entertainment.

Song information
"Numb" was written about Myers' former record label, Atlantic Records. Myers stated "They’re a very radio single-driven label, and we were under pressure at the time. But that’s not me. The radio has certainly helped my career, but that’s not a focus for me. My focus is to create and then to give it to my fans. To experiment and speak from my heart, sonically or visually. So when I wrote that, I reached a point where I felt like the constant search for a radio single was ridiculous. And when I finished, I was like “we have it! We have a radio single, and it happens to be about them.” It wasn’t written as a woman against men, but more of what I was going through as a person."

Track listing

Charts

References

2018 albums
Meg Myers albums